Lots Road Power Station is a disused coal and later oil-fired and later gas-fired power station on the River Thames at Lots Road in Chelsea, London in the south-west of the Royal Borough of Kensington & Chelsea, which supplied electricity to the London Underground system. It is sometimes erroneously referred to as Fulham Power Station, a name properly applied to another former station a mile south-west along the Tideway.

History 
A power station at Lots Road was originally planned by the Brompton & Piccadilly Circus Railway (B&PCR, now part of the Piccadilly line) in 1897. The B&PCR was controlled by the District Railway (DR, now the District line) from 1898, and was sold in 1901 to Charles Yerkes' Metropolitan District Electric Traction Company, which built the station to provide power to the DR. The station allowed the District line trains to change from steam haulage to electric. At around the same time the Metropolitan Railway built its power station at Neasden.

The station was built end-on to the Thames, on the north bank of the tidal Chelsea Creek. Construction started in 1902 and was completed in December 1904, the station becoming operational on 1 February 1905. The station burned 700 tonnes of coal a day and had a generating capacity of 50,000 kW.  At the time it was claimed to be the largest power station ever built, and it eventually powered  most of the railways and tramways in the Underground Group.

The station was re-equipped and improved several times. During the early 1920s a sump and hopper system for more efficient fuel handling was installed. It was designed by The Underfeed Stoker Company and constructed under their stewardship by Peter Lind & Company, who still trade in London today. The modernisation undertaken in the 1960s converted the station from  Hz to 50 Hz generation and from coal burning to heavy fuel oil. The number of chimneys was reduced from the original four to two. Between 1974 and 1977, with the discovery of natural gas in the North Sea, the boilers were converted to burn gas, with the option of oil firing if required. The station later worked in conjunction with the ex-London County Council Tramways power station at Greenwich to supply the London Underground network.

The station played a part in the birth of commercial radio in the UK. When the first two radio stations, LBC and Capital Radio, opened in October 1973, the site for their medium wave transmitters was not complete.  As a result, a temporary 'Tee' antenna was strung up between the two chimneys (transmitting LBC on 417 m (719 kHz), and Capital Radio on 539 m (557 kHz)), until the permanent site at Saffron Green was ready in 1975. Some years later the site was used again, on 720 kHz (for a low power MW relay of BBC Radio 4's LW service) which was in use until 2001 when the radio transmitter was moved to Crystal Palace.

In July 1992, it was decided not to re-equip Lots Road again; rather it was to continue to operate only until the machinery's life was expired.  It was finally shut down on 21 October 2002, and since then all power for the Tube system has been supplied from the National Grid.

Redevelopment
The property company that bought the site wished to convert the station into shops, restaurants and apartments, and to construct additional buildings, including two skyscrapers, on the adjoining vacant land. The scheme was delayed because Kensington & Chelsea Council refused planning permission for one of the two towers. The other, South Tower, the taller, was granted permission by Hammersmith & Fulham Council, but the developer was unwilling to proceed without permission for both. On 30 January 2006 the Secretary of State, considering especially views of the Planning Inspector, granted planning permission for the development. In 2007 the developer hoped to complete the scheme by 2013, but it was delayed by the economic downturn.

On 13 September 2010, Thames Water announced that they would be building the Thames Tideway super sewer. One of the preferred accesses, Cremorne Wharf Foreshore, adjoins but which will end a nearby combined sewer overflow. The consultation period ended in Autumn 2010.

On 26 September 2013, developer Hutchison Whampoa Properties broke ground on the eight-acre site, rebranding it as "Chelsea Waterfront", with Mayor of London Boris Johnson speaking at the ceremony: "The £1 billion scheme will be the biggest riverside development on the north bank [of the Thames] for over 100 years, and will create 706 homes." 

New planning and design details were conceived between 2010 and 2012, with construction for the first phase (100 apartments) completed by 2016, and phase two, which included the power station itself, completed  by 2018.

See also

 Power House, Chiswick – its generating capacity was subsumed by Lots Road in 1917
 Greenwich Power Station – London Underground's Standby power station

References

External links

 Pictures from inside the power station
 MB21 Transmission Gallery – Lots Road Broadcast Site
 YouTube – Lots Road Power Station in a snowstorm
 YouTube – Demolition of part of the station during redevelopment
 YouTube – Demolition of part of the station during redevelopment
 – Thames Tideway
 

Energy infrastructure completed in 1902
1905 establishments in England
2002 disestablishments in England
Coal-fired power stations in England
Oil-fired power stations in England
Redevelopment projects in London
History of the Royal Borough of Kensington and Chelsea
London Underground infrastructure
Power stations on the River Thames
Former power stations in London
Port of London
Grade II listed buildings in the Royal Borough of Kensington and Chelsea
Chelsea, London